Hurricane Edna was a deadly and destructive major hurricane that impacted the United States East Coast in September of the 1954 Atlantic hurricane season. It was one of two hurricanes to strike Massachusetts in that year, the other being Hurricane Carol. The fifth tropical cyclone and storm of the season, as well as the fourth hurricane and second major hurricane, Edna developed from a tropical wave on September 2. Moving towards the north-northwest, Edna skirted the northern Leeward Islands as a tropical depression before turning more towards the west. The depression attained tropical storm status to the east of Puerto Rico and strengthened further to reach hurricane status by September 7. The storm rapidly intensified and reached its peak intensity of 125 mph (205 km/h) north of the Bahamas before weakening to Category 2 status near landfall in Massachusetts on September 11. Edna transitioned into an extratropical cyclone in Atlantic Canada before its remnants dissipated in the northern Atlantic.

Edna caused 29 fatalities throughout its lifetime as a tropical cyclone, as well as a moderate amount of damage. It first caused rainfall-induced flooding in Puerto Rico, and it later brushed the Bahamas. High waves affected the coastline of North Carolina. Edna resulted in the heaviest day of rainfall in New York City in 45 years, while strong waves cut off Montauk from the remainder of Long Island. There were six highway deaths in the state, and $1.5 million in crop damage. There were widespread evacuations in southern New England, after Hurricane Carol struck the same area only 11 days prior. Strong winds caused extensive power outages for 260,000 people, including nearly all of Cape Cod. Edna became the costliest hurricane in the history of Maine, where the hurricane caused flooding that washed out roads and rail lines. There were 21 deaths in New England, eight of whom in Maine due to drownings. Later, high winds severely damaged crops in Atlantic Canada.

Meteorological history

Hurricane Edna originated in an easterly tropical wave which modern research has estimated to have spawned a tropical depression east of the Caribbean Sea on September 2, 1954. The low pressure area was not observed in real time until several days later, on September 5, while situated between Puerto Rico and The Bahamas. Additionally, the island of Puerto Rico experienced torrential rainfall in association with the storm. Operationally, the system was not recognized to have organized into a tropical cyclone until September 6; it is listed in the Atlantic hurricane database as achieving tropical storm intensity early on September 4. Edna proceeded west-northwestward, bypassing Hispaniola to the north, and by September 7 it had strengthened into a minimal hurricane on the present-day Saffir–Simpson Hurricane Scale.

Initially a rather small storm in terms of physical size, the hurricane steadily intensified throughout the day. Reconnaissance aircraft flew into the storm frequently to take observations on the cyclone's structure. The center of circulation passed near San Salvador Island, and on September 8, Edna further strengthened into a Category 3 major hurricane while broadly curving northward. The overall circulation increased in size as banding features became more well-defined. However, reconnaissance data was at times inconsistent and inaccurate, leading to suspicious and unlikely jogs in the storm's track. The cause of these errors is attributed to misinterpretation of radar information.

The radius of hurricane-force winds increased, and the storm may have become asymmetrical, with convection concentrated to the right of the center, although this was not confirmed due to a lack of data. An approaching weak frontal boundary spread overcast conditions over the Eastern Seaboard north of North Carolina. By September 10, Edna was located just south of Cape Hatteras, passing east of the Outer Banks early the next day. As the hurricane accelerated to the northeast, it began to deteriorate and weaken. Closely following the recent track of Hurricane Carol, Edna approached New England, but diverged from Carol's track upon skirting the eastern coast instead of moving inland. Weather reporting stations in the Mid-Atlantic States reported rapid clearing as the storm gained latitude, while heavy rain and gusty winds enveloped New England. It subsequently tracked just east of Eastport, Maine. The storm continued northeastward into Atlantic Canada and transitioned into an extratropical cyclone, although the exact time of this transition is unknown. The storm's extratropical remnants reemerged into the northern Atlantic after crossing eastern Canada and were last noted on September 15.

Preparations
In advance of the storm, hurricane warnings were issued for parts of The Bahamas and South Florida, as winds of up to hurricane force were expected. Farther to the north, storm warnings were posted from Myrtle Beach, South Carolina to Eastport, Maine. Along the coast of North Carolina and the Virginia Capes, where gale-force winds and high tides were expected, residents were advised to take precautions. In New York City, it was to be considered "a miracle" if Edna did not strike the area directly, and the storm was predicted to be one of the most severe hurricanes in the history of the New York Weather Bureau. In the 24 hours before the storm struck, New York Telephone received 361,392 calls, which was the third highest volume the company ever recorded. In the Montauk area, 500 residents evacuated their homes by early September 11, while all businesses closed in Westerly, Rhode Island. Businesses in Providence, which was flooded during Hurricane Carol, prepared sandbags to mitigate flooding. Most beach homes had closed for the summer season, and hundreds of people who lived along the southern New England coast evacuated. Other threatened areas were evacuated, including Milford, Connecticut, where 3,000 families left their homes. Sirens alerted other residents to remain indoors and drivers to stay off the highways. Along the coast of Connecticut, bus and train service was halted. A state of emergency was declared in New London, and mail service was canceled in some areas. On September 10, the Navy ordered the evacuation of hundreds of warships and aircraft. Coast Guard planes evacuated from Rhode Island and Massachusetts. About 40 Red Cross shelters, which were opened during Hurricane Carol 11 days prior, were reopened to provide food. Officers at Fort Devens sent 40 trucks with cots, blankets, and generators to areas expected to be struck by the storm. Advance warning was credited with a lower death toll in Edna than Carol.

Impact

West Indies
On September 7, a bulletin from San Juan, Puerto Rico reported extensive, flood-inducing rainfall along the western and southern coasts of the island. Over  of precipitation fell within a two-day period. The easternmost islands of The Bahamas, including San Salvador, experienced gale-force winds and high seas.

United States
Winds blew at up to  along the shore, accompanied by strong surf, although no fatalities or major property damage resulted from the storm. Tides at Norfolk, Virginia were only slightly above normal during the storm's passage to the east, and winds were moderate in strength. Peripheral rainfall in Maryland and Delaware eased drought conditions. Further north, Long Island also suffered moderate to strong winds, blowing from the north at their peak. A Weather Bureau station in New York City recorded  winds midday on September 11. Rainfall reached  in the city, becoming the wettest day in 45 years. The storm cut off Montauk Point on eastern Long Island at its height, prompting the Coast Guard to temporarily relocate 500 families. Crop damage in New York was estimated at $1.5 million, and six people died in the city due to highway deaths.

The high winds caused widespread power outages, including for nearly all of Cape Cod. The storm surge reached  along the Massachusetts coast, causing flooding and heavy boating damage. Damage in Connecticut and Rhode Island was mainly in areas already affected by Hurricane Carol. Several streets were washed out, and rivers rose above flood stage.

Damage was heaviest in Maine, estimated at $25 million, which made Edna the costliest hurricane in the state's history. The Androscoggin and Kennebec rivers both reached above-normal levels, causing flooding and washing out roads. Flooding entered basements, affected fields, and covered bridges. In West Peru, the floods washed out a bridge that was under construction. In addition, the winds downed trees, which blocked widespread roads and caused power outages in 18% of the state. Washed out roads and rail lines cut off the state from the rest of New England. Another stranded family was rescued after seven hours in Unity, in which one child and a rescuer were killed. There were eight deaths in the state, most of whom related to cars being swept away by floods.

There were 21 deaths in New England, including eight drownings in Maine. Throughout the United States, damage was estimated at $42,815,000. Damage was less from Edna than from Carol, primarily due to its strongest winds not occurring at the time of highest tides, and its track farther to the east. Throughout New England, 260,000 people lost power, most of whom in Massachusetts.

Atlantic Canada
While rapidly losing characteristics of a tropical cyclone, Edna traversed central New Brunswick. In contrast with the smaller, more compact Hurricane Juan, which struck Atlantic Canada in 2003, Edna was a much larger storm with strong winds extending hundreds of miles from the center. The tightest pressure gradient was focused on the east side of the storm, over mainland Nova Scotia. Edna brought down approximately 700 million board feet of timber, and although the amount of trees the storm destroyed was comparable to that of Juan, its effects were more widespread and not as locally severe. The intense winds downed power and telephone lines and destroyed many barns; one such structural collapse killed a man, and livestock were lost throughout the region. Other damage to property included several fallen chimneys, a toppled church steeple in Pictou, and roof failures. In Kentville, an apartment building undergoing construction was destroyed. Approximately $3 million CAD in apple crops were decimated, while in Yarmouth, both live lobsters and lobster pots were lost. Debris blocked streets across the province, and at least  of road was washed out. Damage in Nova Scotia totaled $6 million CAD: in the aftermath, Yarmouth and Kentville declared states of emergency.

Wind damage was less significant than in Nova Scotia, although still evident in structures and utility lines. A theatre in McAdam was destroyed, and several people were injured across the area. The storm flooded streets in St. Stephen. About 400 salmon, valued at $10,000 CAD, were lost in Dalhousie. Total damage in the province is estimated at $1.78 million CAD. Elsewhere, power outages were reported in Montreal.

Aftermath
Throughout New England, 20 counties were declared states of emergency. After the storm, Southern New England Telephone sent a crew of 100 workers in 50 trucks to Maine to assist in restoring power. Power was quickly restored, and in some places the outages were less severe than during Carol. For only the third time in its history, the Portland Evening Express was not delivered due to the storm. Most primary roads were re-opened by two days after the storm, although rural areas and rail lines took longer to repair. There was a temporary travel ban for all but emergency vehicles in Maine due to washed out roads. Affecting densely populated portions of the state, Edna struck the day before the governor race between Republican Burton M. Cross and Democratic Edmund Muskie. Before the election, politicians commented how a suppressed turnout as a result of the storm would benefit Muskie, in a state where no Democrat had won governorship since 1934. Muskie ultimately won the election in a close race, which saw a lower turnout than 1950, likely due to Edna suppressing the rural, Republican turnout.

After a survey from the Federal Civil Defense Administration described damage as "tremendous", President Dwight Eisenhower declared portions of Maine as a disaster area, which allocated federal funding for relief. The president also authorized additional aid to Rhode Island and Massachusetts due to additional damage there from Edna. Due to the severity of the storm, the name Edna was retired after this usage, for ten years before it was reintroduced for the 1968 season. At the 1969 Interdepartmental Hurricane Conference, it was proposed that the names Edna, Carol, and Hazel be permanently retired because of their importance to the research community. Despite the proposal, the name Edna was added to the 1972 naming list, but was ultimately unused.

In Popular Culture

In 1954 E.B. White published in The New Yorker "The Eye of Edna,"  a witty satire that pokes gentle fun at radio announcers who seem to enjoy the hurricane and make exaggerated predictions of its speed and strength.

See also

 List of New England hurricanes
 Hurricane Bob

References

 McCarthy Earls, Eamon. "Twisted Sisters: How Four Superstorms Forever Changed the Northeast in 1954 & 1955." Franklin: Via Appia Press (www.viaappiapress.com), 2014.

External links
History of notable Atlantic hurricanes 
U.S. Weather Bureau advisories

Edna
Edna (1954)
Edna
Edna
Edna
Edna
Edna
Edna (1994)